Adiantum polyphyllum is a fern in the genus Adiantum, endemic to Colombia, Venezuela, and Trinidad and Tobago.

References

 Sp. Pl. 5: 454 1810.
 The Plant List entry
 Encyclopedia of Life entry
 Hortipedia entry

polyphyllum